Care-O-bot is the product vision of a mobile robot assistant to actively support humans e.g. in their daily life, in hotels, health care institutions or hospitals, developed by the   Fraunhofer Institute for Manufacturing Engineering and Automation.

The fourth generation, Care-O-bot 4, was completed in January 2015. While its predecessors from 1998 onwards were used primarily in the development of technological fundamentals, Care-O-bot 4 is a modular product family providing the basis for commercial service robot solutions. In 2015, the product design of Care-O-bot 4 was awarded with the Red Dot Award: Product Design. As only 1,6 percent of all applications, Care-O-bot 4 received the recognition "Best of the Best”.

Numerous research institutions and universities around the world work with Care-O-bot to advance the areas of applications.

References

External links 
 Website Care-O-bot
 Website Fraunhofer Institute for Manufacturing Engineering and Automation IPA

Service robots